Masan (also Romanized as Māsān) is a village in Gavrud Rural District, Muchesh District, Kamyaran County, Kurdistan Province, Iran. At the 2006 census, its population was 552, in 129 families. The village is populated by Kurds.

References 

Towns and villages in Kamyaran County
Kurdish settlements in Kurdistan Province